Panax zingiberensis is a species of plant in the family Araliaceae. It is endemic to China.

References

zingiberensis
Endemic flora of China
Endangered plants
Taxonomy articles created by Polbot